Kumasi High School, often referred to as KUHIS, is a category A boys' senior high school in the Ashanti region of Ghana. It was established in 1962, by  S. K. Amoah.  The students are known collectively as Mmerantee(Gentlemen).

See also 
List of boarding schools
List of senior secondary schools in Ghana

References

External links

 mmerantee

Boys' schools in Ghana
Educational institutions established in 1964
High schools in Ghana
Education in Kumasi
1964 establishments in Ghana